Altamira is one of one hundred and forty-four municipalities in the state of Pará, in northern Brazil. It occupies 12.8% of the state's territory, 1.8% of Brazil's territory and 0.8% of South America. It also covers a more extensive area than 104 countries, and is comparable to the US state of Missouri or Florida.

Altamira Municipality encompasses the Altamira city and district, the seat of local government, whose majority population lives in urban area, and nine other mostly rural districts (most of those covered by the Amazon rainforest), whose urban populations are minorities, and live in inhabited areas spaced by tens or hundreds of kilometers. According to the 2010 Brazilian National Census the municipality had 99,075 inhabitants which grew to 115,969 at the 2020 Census, making a density of only 0.73 inhabitants per square kilometer at the same year. It is home to hundreds of indigenous communities and environmental protection areas. The Belo Monte Dam, a hydroelectric dam complex is currently under construction in the area of the Xingu River in the municipality.

History
The history of Altamira traditionally includes the period from the installation of the Jesuit mission of the city to the present day. However, the municipal territory has been inhabited since time immemorial by nomadic and semi-nomadic indigenous peoples.

Kuben-Kran-Keñ, an extinct Jê language belonging to the Kayapó group, was once spoken in the municipality.

Mission Tavaquara
Although it is well known that even before the eighteenth century former Jesuit Missions already inhabited the Xingu region, it was not until the 1750s that Father Roque Hunderfund entered the Xingu River until the Tucuruí Igarapé, later called Vitória. There, he made contacts with indigenous Xipaia and Kuruaya, who guided him towards Volta Grande do Xingu. There, near the mouth of the Panelas stream, they chose the foundation of the Tavaquara Mission, whose settlement formed the city of Altamira.

The policies of the Portuguese Prime Minister Marquês de Pombal, still in the eighteenth century, shut down all Jesuit missions in the colonies, causing the Tavaquara Mission to close its activities. The parish of Souzel continued to assist the village, but only in 1841 did Fr. Antonio Torquato de Souza reopen the sting that linked the Victoria stream on the lower Xingu ground to the Tavaquara Mission, higher up. crossing the waterfalls, making the work in Tavaquara more accessible.

Administrative recognition
The first administrative elevation took place on April 14, 1874, when the municipality of Souzel (now Senator José Porfírio ) was created, where the Tavaquara Mission (Altamira) was elevated to the status of village. During this period the village survived from the extraction and commercialization of rubber and other drugs from the backlands, as well as communicating with Souzel and Moz Port by steam navigation.

On April 2, 1883, under the influence of Colonel Francisco Gayoso, the town of Tavaquara was elevated to the town of Souzel, receiving the name of Altamira. Also under the influence of Colonel Gayoso, a bite was opened, linking the bass to the middle Xingu, with the objective of turning it into a road, employing African slave labor.

In 1880, Agrarian Cavalgante resumed the works of Col. Gayoso, rectifying the layout of the road, starting from where today is the headquarters of the municipality of Vitória do Xingu and arriving at the mouth of the Ambé stream, there building Fort Ambé, which no longer exists.

Economy

The municipal GDP is around US$450 million and is mainly linked to agricultural activities, trade and since 2010 has been driven by the construction of the Belo Monte Dam.

The municipality is served by Altamira Airport.

Belo Monte Dam

In Altamira the third-largest dam in the world by generating capacity (behind the Three Gorges Dam and Itaipu Dam), with a capacity of 11.233 GW, is being built. As of October 2019 all turbines at Pimental and 17 turbines in main power powerhouse are online with total installed capacity of 10,388.87 MW at Belo Monte site, totaling 10,621.97 with the Pimental site.

Geography

Altamira is located in a transition area between the Brazilian Highlands and Amazonian Lowlands, is situated on the shores of the Xingu River a tributary of the Amazon River, with average elevation of 109 meters.

The municipality contains part of the  Altamira National Forest, a sustainable use conservation unit created in 1998.
The municipality contains part of the Jamanxim National Park, a protected area.
It contains part of the  Terra do Meio Ecological Station, a strictly protected conservation unit created in 2005.
It also contains part of the  Nascentes da Serra do Cachimbo Biological Reserve, a strictly protected conservation unit established in 2005.
The municipality contains 49% of the  Serra do Pardo National Park, established at the same time.

Climate
The climate of Altamira is tropical monsoon (Köppen Am), with high temperatures all year and average rainfall of  annually. The seasons are undefined by temperature, but there is a distinct wet season from November/December to May/June and a dry season from July to October, although some rain does occur during this dry season.

Media
Altamira is an important destination in the 1979 movie Bye Bye Brasil.

See also
Belo Monte Dam

References

Municipalities in Pará
Populated places established in the 1750s